The Tula River is a river in Hidalgo State in central Mexico, and a tributary of the Moctezuma River.

Geography
It runs through the city of Tula de Allende and begins as a drainage channel for the Valley of Mexico, which contains the metropolitan Mexico City region.

The Moctezuma River is a tributary of the Pánuco River.

The river is significantly contaminated with both organic and inorganic substances. Tilapia caught from the Tula river contain levels of lead that greatly exceed the established safety limits for consumption. Unusually high levels of cadmium, arsenic and lead were found in samples of Tula zooplankton.

References

Rivers of Hidalgo (state)
Tributaries of the Pánuco River